The Burial of Kojo is a 2018 Ghanaian drama film written, composed and directed by Blitz Bazawule. Produced by Bazawule, Ama K. Abebrese and Kwaku Obeng Boateng, it was filmed entirely in Ghana on a micro-budget, with local crew and several first-time actors. The film tells the story of Kojo, who is left to die in an abandoned gold mine, as his young daughter Esi travels through a spirit land to save him.

It had its world premiere in New York on 21 September 2018, at the Urban World Film Festival, where it was recognized as Best Narrative Feature (World Cinema). The film received nine nominations at the 15th Africa Movie Academy Awards and won two, including Best First Feature Film by a Director. It is distributed by ARRAY and was released on streaming service Netflix on 31 March 2019, making it the first Ghanaian film to premiere in selected countries worldwide, on Netflix.

Plot 
Esi recounts her childhood in rural Ghana, where she lives in a village in a lake similar to the real-life village, Nzulezo, built on stilts, with her father Kojo and her mother Ama, who supplies most of the family's small income through sewing. Kojo grew up in a large city but fled to the village after a tragic event, feeling that "only water could cleanse the past." Esi is close to her father, who takes her around the lake in his boat and tells her stories whose beginnings only make sense if you know their endings. An unexpected visitor — an old blind man from "the realm in-between" where "everything is upside down" — arrives in the village and entrusts Esi with a sacred white bird that he says is being hunted by the crow who rules the land in-between.

Soon thereafter, the family receives another unexpected visitor — Esi's uncle Kwabena, from whom Kojo has been estranged. Kwabena persuades Kojo to bring his family to the city from which Kojo had fled seven years before. There, they live with Esi's grandmother, with whom Esi watches a Spanish-language Mexican telenovela featuring a conflict between two brothers who love the same woman. It transpires that Kojo and Kwabena had also once loved the same woman, who had died on the day of her wedding to Kwabena due to Kojo driving drunk. Kwabena, however, says that the past is the past, and wants Kojo to join him in illegal small-scale gold mining to make money. Initially reluctant, Kojo is finally persuaded, and goes with his brother to an old mine on property now owned by a Chinese company. Without warning, Kwabena pushes Kojo into an abandoned mineshaft and runs away. Esi and Ama go to the police to report Kojo missing. Esi continues to have visions of the "crow who ruled the land in-between." She realizes that the crow is her uncle Kwabena, who also died in the drunk driving accident seven years before, and the sacred white bird is her father, and that only she can find him.

Cast 
 Cynthia Dankwa as Esi
 Ama K. Abebrese as Older Esi (narrator)
 Joseph Otsiman as Kojo, Esi's father
 Mamley Djangmah as Ama, Esi's mother
 Kobina Amissah-Sam as Kwabena, Kojo's brother
 Henry Adofo as Apalu
 Joyce Anima Misa Amoah as Nana, Esi's grandmother
 Brian Angels as Sergeant Asare
 Joe Addo as Detective Koomson
 Emanuel Nerttey as Young Kojo
 Edward Dankwa as Young Kwabena
 Zalfa Odonkor as Adwoa

Reception

Critical reception 
The film has received favorable reviews from critics.

Richard Brody of The New Yorker wrote, "Bazawule offers a portrait of a dawning artist that catches the early flame of artistic inspiration from within." John DeFore of The Hollywood Reporter wrote, "Viewers may worry that Bazawule's starkly gorgeous pictures aren't going to add up to anything, but Burial satisfies in prosaic as well as poetic terms, supplying an end that makes sense of its beginning. It will leave many who see it eager for the young filmmaker's next fable." Brian Costello of Common Sense Media wrote, "This is a lush and beautiful film, filled with dazzling images drawn as much from magical realism as from the setting itself."

Awards

References

External links 

 

2018 films
English-language Netflix original films
2018 multilingual films
Films set in Africa
Films shot in Ghana
Ghanaian drama films
2010s English-language films
English-language Ghanaian films
Twi-language films